Aleksandr Yevgenyevich Dovbnya (born 14 February 1996) is a Russian professional footballer who plays as a defender for Amkal Moscow.

Club career
On 16 July 2019, he signed a long-term contract with Russian Premier League club FC Arsenal Tula. On 29 January 2020, he joined FC Rotor Volgograd on loan until the end of the 2019–20 season. He made his Russian Premier League debut for Arsenal on 4 July 2020 in a game against FC Dynamo Moscow, replacing Aleksandr Denisov at half-time.

International career
He was on the roster of the Russia national under-17 football team at the 2013 UEFA European Under-17 Championship, which Russia won, even though he didn't play in any games at the tournament.

Career statistics

Club

Honours
Russia
 UEFA European Under-17 Championship: 2013

References

External links
 
 

1996 births
Footballers from Moscow
Living people
Russian footballers
Russia youth international footballers
Russia under-21 international footballers
Association football defenders
FC Lokomotiv Moscow players
Ethnikos Achna FC players
Pafos FC players
FC Arsenal Tula players
FC Rotor Volgograd players
FC Kyzylzhar players
Cypriot First Division players
Russian Premier League players
Russian First League players
Russian Second League players
Kazakhstan Premier League players
Russian expatriate footballers
Expatriate footballers in Cyprus
Russian expatriate sportspeople in Cyprus
Expatriate footballers in Kazakhstan
Russian expatriate sportspeople in Kazakhstan